Chess at the 2019 African Games was held from 24 to 28 August 2019 in Casablanca, Morocco.

Participating nations

Medal table

Medal summary

References

External links
 Results

2019 African Games
African Games
2019 African Games
2019